St John's University of Tanzania (SJUT) is a private university in Dodoma, Tanzania. It was established in 2007 and is owned by the Anglican Church of Tanzania. The university has more than 4500 students and offers degrees in business administration, education, nursing, pharmacy, community development, development studies, holistic child development and theology. The Rt Rev Donald Mtetemela, the former archbishop and primate of Tanzania, is the university's current chancellor.

References

External links
 
 Friends of St. John's University

Private universities in Tanzania
Universities in Dodoma
Anglican education
Anglican universities and colleges
Educational institutions established in 2007
Dodoma
2007 establishments in Tanzania
Anglican buildings and structures in Africa